U.S. Route 40 (US-40) is a part of the U.S. Highway System that runs from Interstate 80 (I-80) and US-189 in Silver Summit, Utah east to US-322 and Ocean Drive in Atlantic City, New Jersey. In the U.S. state of Kansas, US-40 is a main east–west highway that runs from the Colorado border east to the Missouri border. A majority of the route overlaps I-70 through the state.

Route description

US 40 enters Kansas near the unincorporated community of Weskan. The first sizable town it enters is Sharon Springs, where it intersects K-27. From there it goes northeast to Oakley and follows Eagle Eye Road before merging with I-70 east of town. The two routes remain merged until Topeka, although the prior alignment of US 40, named Old Highway 40, parallels I-70 for most of the way. From Ellsworth to Salina, the old alignment of US 40 is signed as K-140.

In Topeka, US 40 leaves I-70 at exit 366, follows the Oakland Expressway concurrent with K-4 north to 6th Avenue, then heads east along 6th Avenue out of town. Through Topeka, US 40 closely follows the route of the Oregon Trail. At the Shawnee-Douglas county line near Big Springs, US 40 crosses to the south of I-70 and enters Lawrence from the west along West 6th Street. At the west side of Lawrence, the route is joined by K-10 and travels south and east to the junction with US 59 and then runs north with US 59 to cross the Kansas River. It follows North 2nd and North 3rd Streets, crosses back under I-70, leaves US 59, and merges with US 24 before leaving town.

US 40 remains merged with US 24 as the two routes travel northeast to the town of Tonganoxie. From there, the merged routes turn due east toward Kansas City, Kansas. In Kansas City, US 40 and US 24 intersect US 73 and K-7, and turning south toward Interstate 70. US 40, along with US 24, then merge onto I-70 and recross the Kansas River over the Lewis and Clark Viaduct just before entering Kansas City, Missouri.

On December 1, 2008, US 40, along with US 24 and US 73, was rerouted south along K-7 west of Kansas City to the intersection with I-70. Before this date, US 40 and US 24 continued along State Avenue to College Parkway before turning right to follow Turner Diagonal for  where US 40 joined Interstate 70 for the duration of its journey eastward toward Missouri.

In 1951, the State of Kansas designated U.S. Route 40 as a Blue Star Memorial Highway from border to border.

History

By October 1967, the section of I-70 from north of Dorrance to north of Salina was open to traffic. Then in an October 13, 1967 resolution, US-40 was realigned onto the newly opened section I-70.

Major intersections
Exit numbers are those of I-70 and Kansas Turnpike

Related routes

WaKeeney business loop

U.S. Route 40 Business (US-40 Bus.) is a  business route through WaKeeney, Kansas, that was recommended in 1979 as substitute for the formerly proposed Interstate 70 Business Loop. It begins at exit 127 on Interstate 70/U.S. Route 40 (I-70/US-40) and travels to the north, concurrent with US-283 along South First Street. At the intersection with Barclay Avenue (Old Highway 40), US-40 Bus. and US-283 turn to the east. By the time Barclay Avenue encounters South 13th Street, US-283 turns left to the north, US-40 Bus. turns right to the south, and Old Highway 40 continues straight ahead to the east. After passing by the Kansas Veterans Cemetery, and the headquarters for the Western Co-Op Electric Association, US-40 Bus. terminates at exit 128 on I-70/US-40, while South 13th Street continues as a local road that changes its name to 260th Avenue.

Russell business loop

U.S. Route 40 Business (US-40 Bus.) was a short business loop through Russell, Kansas. It ran from Exit 184 along Interstate 70/US 40, overlapping part of U.S. Route 281 (South Fossil Street) then makes a right turn onto East Wichita Avenue (old US 40). Just before the intersection with 187th Street, the road curves from east to southeast as it follows the south side of a railroad line, and passes the northeast side of the Russell Municipal Airport. East Wichita Avenue ends at 189th Street and BUS US 40 makes a right turn south as it ends at Exit 189 on I-70/US 40.

Business US 40 was approved in a meeting on October 13, 1979, after Alternate US 40 was decommissioned in Russell. US-40 Bus. was approved by AASHTO to be decommissioned on October 17, 2013. US-40 Bus. was decommissioned by KDOT on November 15, 2013.

Junction City business loop

U.S. Route 40 Business (US-40 Bus.) is a business loop through Junction City. US-40 Business was approved in a meeting on October 13, 1979.

See also

References

External links

Kansas Department of Transportation State Map
KDOT: Historic State Maps

40
 Kansas
Transportation in Wallace County, Kansas
Transportation in Logan County, Kansas
Transportation in Gove County, Kansas
Transportation in Trego County, Kansas
Transportation in Ellis County, Kansas
Transportation in Russell County, Kansas
Transportation in Ellsworth County, Kansas
Transportation in Lincoln County, Kansas
Transportation in Saline County, Kansas
Transportation in Dickinson County, Kansas
Transportation in Geary County, Kansas
Transportation in Riley County, Kansas
Transportation in Wabaunsee County, Kansas
Transportation in Shawnee County, Kansas
Transportation in Douglas County, Kansas
Transportation in Leavenworth County, Kansas
Transportation in Wyandotte County, Kansas
Salina, Kansas micropolitan area
Topeka, Kansas
Lawrence, Kansas
Transportation in Kansas City, Kansas